Scopulini is a tribe of the geometer moth family (Geometridae), with about 900 species in seven genera. The tribe was described by Philogène Auguste Joseph Duponchel in 1845.

Systematics 
Scopulini as a family name is an old synonym of the subfamily Sterrhinae (Meyrick, 1892). The tribe Scopulini is divided into seven genera, of which only Scopula and Problepsis have species in Europe.
 Scopulini Duponchel, 1845
 Dithalama Meyrick, 1888 (4 species in Australia and Tasmania)
 Isoplenodia Prout, 1932 (4 species in Africa)
 Lipomelia Warren, 1893 (1 species from India to Taiwan)
 Somatina Guenée, 1858 (44 species in Africa, East Asia and Australia)
 Zythos D. S. Fletcher, 1979 (11 species from Indonesia up to Papua-New Guinea)
 Problepsis Lederer, 1853 (51 species in the Palearctic, Africa, South-East Asia to Australia)
 Scopula Schrank, 1802  (including Glossotrophia Prout, 1913 and Holarctias Prout, 1913) (over 800 species)

Phylogenetics
The phylogenetics of Scopulini was described in detail in 2005 by Pasi Sihvonen.

Literature 
 Hausmann, Axel The Geometrid Moths of Europe, 2. Sterrhinae. Apollo Books, Stenstrup 2004, 
 Abraham, D.; Ryrholm, N.; Wittzell, H.; Holloway, J. D.; Scoble, M. J.; Lofstedt, C.: "Molecular phylogeny of the subfamilies in Geometridae (Geometroidea: Lepidoptera)". Molecular Phylogenetics and Evolution. 20(1): 65-77 (2001)

External links 
 Lepiforum e.V.
 Moths and Butterflies of Europe and North Africa
 
 Fauna Europaea